The following is a list of churches in Eden District.

The following parishes have no active churches: Colby, Crackenthorpe, Hartley, Helbeck, Hoff, Hunsonby, Kaber, Newby, Shap Rural, Sockbridge and Tirril, Thrimby, Waitby, Wharton and Yanwath and Eamont Bridge.

The district has an estimated 121 active churches for 53,000 people, a ratio of one church to every 438 inhabitants. This is the lowest ratio in England outside of the sui generis City of London.

Map of medieval parish churches
For the purposes of this map medieval is taken to be pre-1485. It is of note that Cumbria, unlike most parts of England, saw a sustained programme of church building during the 16th and 17th centuries as the more remote parts of the district were settled.

List

Defunct churches

References 

Eden District churches
Churches
 
Churches